"Nothin' My Love Can't Fix" is a song by American actor and singer Joey Lawrence, released as the first single from his self-titled debut album on February 15, 1993, by MCA Records subsidiary Impact Records. Written by Lawrence, Alexandra Forbes and Eric Beall and produced by Forbes, Beall, Steve Barri and Tony Peluso, "Nothin' My Love Can't Fix" is Lawrence's most successful single, peaking at number 19 on the US Billboard Hot 100 and number 10 on the Billboard Mainstream Top 40. It also reached number 13 in the United Kingdom, number 22 in Ireland, number 50 in Canada and number 68 in Australia.

Background
"Nothin' My Love Can't Fix" was written by Joey Lawrence, Alexandra Forbes, and Eric Beall. The song was written when Lawrence was approximately fifteen years old.

Composition
According to the sheet music published at Musicnotes.com by Alfred Publishing, the song is written in the key of F major and is set in time signature of common time with a tempo of 108 beats per minute. Lawrence's vocal range spans three octaves, from F3 to F♯6.

Chart performance
In the United States, "Nothin' My Love Can't Fix" debuted at number 68 on the Billboard Hot 100 for the issue dated March 6, 1993. The song spent 20 weeks on the chart, reaching its peak position of number 19 for the issue dated May 8, 1993. On the 1993 year-end chart, the song achieved a position of number 92.

Music video
The video premiered on February 15, 1993, during an episode of Blossom. Prior to its broadcast, the video was promoted through advertisements on MTV and NBC. The music video received heavy airplay on many outlets, including MTV, and Lawrence was invited to perform on MTV Spring Break, The Arsenio Hall Show, and Top of the Pops.

Track listings and formats

 7-inch single
 "Nothin' My Love Can't Fix"  – 3:59
 "Nothin' My Love Can't Fix" (D. Abraham Slam Mix) – 4:00

 12-inch and CD single
 "Nothin' My Love Can't Fix"  – 3:59
 "Nothin' My Love Can't Fix" (D. Abraham Slam Mix) – 4:00
 "Nothin' My Love Can't Fix" (D. Abraham Alternate Extended Mix) – 5:13

 Cassette single 1
 "Nothin' My Love Can't Fix"  – 3:59
 "Intro"  – 0:13
 "I Can't Help Myself" (excerpt) – 1:27
 "Stay Forever" (excerpt) – 1:47
 "Night by Night" (excerpt) – 1:50

 Cassette single 2
 "Nothin' My Love Can't Fix"  – 3:59
 "Nothin' My Love Can't Fix" (D. Abraham Alternate Slam Mix) – 4:24
 "Nothin' My Love Can't Fix" (D. Abraham Slam Mix) – 4:00
 "Nothin' My Love Can't Fix" (D. Abraham Alternate Extended Mix) – 5:13

 US and UK 7-inch single
 "Nothin' My Love Can't Fix"  – 3:59
 "Nothin' My Love Can't Fix" (D. Abraham Alternate Slam Mix) – 4:24

 Australian CD single
 "Nothin' My Love Can't Fix"  – 3:59
 "Nothin' My Love Can't Fix" (D. Abraham Alternate Extended Mix) – 5:13

Personnel
Personnel are adapted from the Joey Lawrence album liner notes.
 Joey Lawrence – vocals, writing
 Steve Barri – production
 Alexandra Forbes – production, writing
 Eric Beall – production, writing
 Tony Peluso – production, vocal recording, mixing
 Steve Skinner – keyboards, drum programming
 Fred Tenny – recording
 Axel Niehaus – assistant recording engineer
 Fred Kelly – assistant mixing engineer
 Julie Barri – production assistance
 Steve Hall – mastering

Charts

Weekly charts

Year-end charts

Release history

In popular culture
"Nothin' My Love Can't Fix" was used as the end-title theme for the 1993 film Cop and a Half.

References

1993 debut singles
1993 songs
EMI Records singles
MCA Records singles